Kellton Tech Solutions Ltd. (KTSL) is an Indian information technology and outsourcing company headquartered in Hyderabad, India with offices in United States and Europe.The company reported net revenues of Rs. 7.39 billion with more than 1800 employees

Kellton is listed on the Bombay Stock Exchange [BOM: 519602] and the National Stock Exchange of India, under the symbol KELLTONTEC.

History 

The US-based serial entrepreneurs Niranjan Chintam and Krishna Chintam took over city-based VMF Soft Tech Ltd. in 2009 and renamed it to Kellton Tech. Kellton has, since then, expanded their business portfolio by making acquisitions in the US and India.

In March 2022, Kelton Tech announced its strategic business realignment, OneKellton’ initiative  As part of this initiative, Kellton Tech has integrated its global operations to improve client services and become a stronger partner of choice for digital transformation and innovation.

Services 
The company provides Digital Transformation, Digital Connected Enterprise, SAP, Outsourced Product Development, and Digital Commerce and Marketing.

Kellton developed mSehat, a State Innovations in Family Planning Services Agency (SIFPSA) project to help health workers in five districts of Uttar Pradesh to record maternal-infant data in real time and provide them healthcare services.
 mSehat was featured as a Case Study in a World Health Organization (WHO) report. The report observed that mSehat is "currently the largest mHealth implementation in the world in terms of population served".

Locations 

It has offices in Hyderabad, Gurgaon, Lucknow and United States. It established an office in Ireland. Kellton also have offices based in London, England.

Acquisitions 

 2013: Acquired Supremesoft Global Inc, Inc. US based IT consulting company
 2014: Acquired Vivos Professional Services, LLC, USA focusing in the life sciences and healthcare service
 2014: Acquired eVantage Technologies Inc., US-based IT consulting company
 2015: Acquired US-based Prosoft Technology Group, ERP-EAI provider
 2016: Acquired US-based Bokanyi Consulting, an enterprise, analytics and cloud services provider
 2017: Acquired US-based Lenmar Group of Companies, an IT services and solutions group with presence in banking and financial services
2019: Acquired US-based firm known as Tivix that develops cloud-connected web and mobile applications

Awards and recognition

 Kellton Tech was ranked 19th in 2016 and 21st in 2014 in Deloitte Technology Fast 50 India, a survey that ranks the top 50 fastest growing technology companies in India.
 Kellton Tech won two awards at National Awards in IT Excellence - 2016, endorsed by Asian Confederation of Businesses and ‘Stars of the Industry’ group. It won the category 'Best e-governance Implementation’ and was recognized as the ‘Emerging IT Company of the Year’.
 Kellton Tech won the Digitizing India Award, a Cisco initiative in collaboration with CNBC-TV18. It was awarded in the category of 'Digital Innovation in Service Provider Industry'.
 Kellton Tech Solutions on the Forbes Asia's 200 Best Under A Billion List.

References

External links 
 Official website

Companies based in Hyderabad, India
Software companies of India
Information technology consulting firms of India
Business process outsourcing companies of India
2009 establishments in Andhra Pradesh
Companies listed on the National Stock Exchange of India
Companies listed on the Bombay Stock Exchange